Andreas Reize (born 19 May 1975) is a Swiss organist and conductor, with a focus on opera and choral conducting. He was appointed Thomaskantor on 11 September 2021, becoming the 18th director of music to take charge of the world famous Thomanerchor at Leipzig in succession to Johann Sebastian Bach.

Career 
Reize was born and grew up in Solothurn, where he passed the Matura in 1996. He was a long-term member of the Singknaben der St. Ursenkathedrale Solothurn. He studied church music at the Hochschule der Künste Bern and the Musikhochschule Zürich, achieving also master's degrees in piano pedagogy and concert organ playing. He studied organ and harpsichord at the Schola Cantorum Basiliensis from 1999 to 2002, followed by studies of orchestral conducting at the Musikhochschule Luzern.

Reize founded the group Cantus Firmus Vokalensemble und Consort in 2001, and the chamber choir Cantus Firmus Kammerchor in 2006. He became musical director of the Oper Schloss Waldegg in 2006, where his ensembles performed and recorded Rousseau's Le Devin du Village and Handel's Apollo e Dafne. They performed a series of Monteverdi's operas, L'Orfeo in 2017, Il ritorno d'Ulisse in Patria in 2019, and L'incoronazione di Poppea in 2021. He conducted at Theater Biel-Solothurn Rameau's Zaïs and Purcells's Dido and Aeneas.

Reize conducted as a guest at the Nationaltheater Mannheim, the Tonhalle-Orchester Zürich and the Schweizer Kammerchor. In 2007, he was a lecturer at the Swiss Opernstudio. With cantus firmus, he appeared at the Internationale Sommerfestspiele für Alte Musik in Innsbruck, the Bachwochen in Amsoldingen, and in concerts of the Bieler Sinfonieorchester.

Reize was artistic director of the Singknaben der St. Ursenkathedrale Solothurn from 2007 to 2021. They recorded two CDs, Now sleeps the crimson petal in 2016, and Sing a cappella! in 2018.

From 2011 to 2021, Reize also conducted the Gabrielichor in Bern, an ensemble specialised in music for several choirs, including the  settings by Rovetta and Rosenmüller, and Monteverdi's Vespers. He was director of the Zürcher Bach Chor from 2011 to 2021, conducting a repertoire from Renaissance to contemporary, in both orchestral concerts as especially a cappella. The produced a partly staged performance of Purcell's King Arthur, the Swiss first performance of Bach's St John Passion in the instrumentation by Robert Schumann and Der Messias, Mozart's arrangement of Handel's Messiah, among others. They performed at the Augustinerkirche in Erfurt, the Meißen Cathedral and the Dresden Frauenkirche.

Thomaskantor 
On 18 December 2020, Reize was designated by the Leipzig city council as Thomaskantor, the 18th in the position after Johann Sebastian Bach, as the first Swiss and the first Catholic since the Reformation. His predecessor Gotthold Schwarz retired end of June 2021. Reize took office on 11 September 2021, performing in the afternoon Bach's cantata Was Gott tut, das ist wohlgetan, BWV 99, with the Thomanerchor and the Gewandhausorchester in the Motette series. Due to the COVID-19 pandemic, the traditional performance of Bach's Christmas Oratorio was cancelled in 2021, and most boys lived at home instead of the campus. Weekly cantata services were held with groups of 8 or 9 boys. A tendency to smaller groups, also preferred by considerations of historically informed performance, was already supported by Reize's predecessors Biller and Schwarz.

Reize converted to the Lutheran Church, to be a member of the congregation. After a break of two years due to the COVID-19 pandemic, he resumed the traditional summer tour in 2022 with a program titled Salmo!, after the opening with Aguiar's Salmo 150. The tour took the boys to places in Thuringia and to the Lutherkirche in Wiesbaden in a concert of the Rheingau Musik Festival.

Awards 
 1996: Förderpreis of 
 2009: Music prize of Canton of Solothurn
 2009: Preis pro Wartenfels for cultural merits in the Olten region as conductor of the Buchsgau chamber choir
 2011: Anerkennungspreis of the culture foundation Kurt und Barbara Alten
 2017: Music prize of Canton of Solothurn, with the Singknaben of the Solothurn Cathedral

Recordings 
 Rousseau: Le Devin du Village, Cantus Firmus, cpo 2007/DRS 2 
 Handel: Apollo e Dafne and orchestral works, Cantus Firmus, cpo 2011/Radio DRS 2 
 Now Sleeps the Crimson Petal, songs and motets for Advent and Christmas, Rondeau Production, Leipzig 2016 
 Sing a cappella, Rondeau Production, Leipzig 2018

References

External links 
 
 
 Cantusfirmus-Ensemble

1975 births
Living people
Thomaskantors
Swiss conductors (music)
Classical organists
People from Solothurn
University of Bern alumni
Zurich University of the Arts alumni
Schola Cantorum Basiliensis alumni
University of Music and Performing Arts Graz alumni